Vineeth Revi Mathew (born November 5, 1984 in India) is an Indian professional basketball player. He plays for the Young Cagers who compete at the FIBA Asia Champions Cup and is a member of the India national basketball team.

Career
Revi Mathew competed for the India national basketball team for the first time at the FIBA Asia Championship 2009.  He averaged 9.6 points and 6.6 rebounds for the tournament.  He scored a game-high 24 points in an 89-73 victory over Uzbekistan in the 13th place game.

References

External links 

 REAL GM Profile
 Eurosport.com Profile
 Basketball.com Profile

1984 births
Living people
Centers (basketball)
Indian men's basketball players
Young Cagers players
Basketball players from Kerala